Elizabeth Hardy (1794–1854) was an Irish novelist. All of her work was published anonymously. She died while imprisoned for debt in Queen's Bench Prison in London, England after having made a 'credulous' investment in a joint stock bank.

Works
Michael Cassidy, or the Cottage Gardener. (1845).
Owen Glendower or The Prince of Wales: A Historical Romance. London: R. Bentley (1849). 
The Fiery Chief, Owen Glendower: A Historical Romance. London: R. Bentley (1851). 
The Confessor: a Jesuit Tale of the Times, Founded on Fact. London: Clarke, Beeton (1854).

References

1794 births
1854 deaths
Irish women novelists
19th-century Irish novelists
19th-century Irish women writers
People imprisoned for debt